Jaxson Chase Dart (born May 13, 2003) is an American football quarterback for the Ole Miss Rebels. Dart attended and played high school football at Corner Canyon High School in Draper, Utah. He began his college football career at USC in 2021, before transferring to Ole Miss the following year.

High school career
Dart was born in Kaysville, UT on May 13, 2003, the son of Brandon Dart (a former safety for the University of Utah). He attended Roy High School for his first three years of High School before transferring to Corner Canyon High School in Draper, Utah. As a senior, he was the Gatorade Football Player of the Year after he passed for 4,691 yards with a state record 67 touchdowns and only four interceptions. He also rushed for 1,195 yards and 12 touchdowns. He was also the MaxPreps National Player of the Year. Overall during his career he had 10,688 passing yards and 117 touchdowns.

Despite an offer from Arizona State University and off-season training with former ASU QB Taylor Kelly in Tempe, AZ Dart committed to the University of Southern California (USC) to play college football.

In addition to playing football, Dart was a two time all-state third baseman for the baseball team.

College career

USC
Jaxson Dart competed to be Kedon Slovis' backup quarterback his first year at USC in 2021. During the annual Spring Game, Dart impressed coaches with his arm strength and mobility. On the final play of the game Dart threw a touchdown pass to fellow freshman Michael Jackson III, which included an impressive one-handed diving catch.

On September 18, Dart entered the game against Washington State in the second series of the game, replacing injured QB Kedon Slovis. USC was playing their first game after the firing of coach Clay Helton. Dart entered the game and threw an interception on his first series. Dart responded by throwing a 38-yard touchdown pass late in the first half. Dart caught fire the rest of the game. Dart displayed his gifts of improvisation and arm strength. Dart finished the day 30-for-46 for 391 yards with four touchdowns and two interceptions. The Trojans defeated the Cougars 42-14, in a blowout win. Dart's 391 yards set the record for most passing yards ever by a USC QB in his debut breaking, JT Daniels’ record of 282 in 2018.

On November 20, Dart made his first career start against UCLA.

Ole Miss
Following the 2021 season, Lincoln Riley was hired as the head coach of USC. Amidst the rumors that Oklahoma QB Caleb Williams would follow Riley to USC, Dart entered the NCAA transfer portal. He and Michael Trigg then officially enrolled at Ole Miss.

Statistics

References

External links
Ole Miss Rebels bio
USC Trojans bio

2003 births
Living people
People from Kaysville, Utah
Players of American football from Utah
American football quarterbacks
USC Trojans football players
Ole Miss Rebels football players